Oliva faba is a species of sea snail, a marine gastropod mollusk in the family Olividae, the olives.

Description
The length of the shell varies between 15 mm and 23 mm.

Distribution
This marine species occurs off Indonesia, Sri Lanka and Vanuatu

References

External links
 

faba
Gastropods described in 1867